Drosera venusta is a subtropical sundew endemic to South Africa. It was described as a new species by Paul Debbert in 1987. Some have questioned its specific rank, noting its affinity to D. natalensis, while others have reduced it to a synonym of D. natalensis.

See also
List of Drosera species

References

Carnivorous plants of Africa
venusta
Endemic flora of South Africa
Plants described in 1987